Rocky Mountaineer is a Canadian rail-tour company based in Vancouver that operates luxury scenic trains on four rail routes in British Columbia, Alberta, Colorado, and Utah.

History

Via Rail Canada
The Rocky Mountaineer concept was created by Harry Holmes, (CN Locomotive Engineer) and Pat Crowley (tourism entrepreneur) both of Jasper, Alberta, together they developed a business plan which they presented to Via Rail prior to Expo 86. Designed as an all daylight sightseeing train in the Canadian Rockies. Originally in 1988 it began as a once-weekly Via Rail Canada daytime service between Vancouver and both Calgary and Jasper. First departure was on May 22 1988 with a special train for the travel industry and for the traveling public on June 9, 1988, called the Canadian Rockies by Daylight. To maximize scenic views, this service operated only during the day, with an overnight stop in Kamloops. These were express services, with no intermediate stops. On June 4, 1989, Via began its second season of the service, renaming the service the Rocky Mountaineer. The final summer Rocky Mountaineer under Via branding departed Calgary and Jasper on October 12, 1989, and arrived in Vancouver on October 13th. Rocky Mountaineer was removed from schedules and marketing in May 1990. After two financially unsuccessful seasons there had to be a change in approach. The Federal Government decided to see if the private sector could do a better job. The then Minister of Transport and the Minister of Finance Michael Wilson decided to sell of the route, equipment, branding and book of business in the fall of 1989. Early in November 1989 ads were taken out in a number of newspapers soliciting interest in the Rocky Mountaineer.

Private operation

Federal Government curtailed the subsidies to Via Rail in 1989, dramatically reducing services, especially the transcontinental service. The Rocky Mountaineer was a tourist service, and as such the government felt the funds could be better spent on other priorities. They asked then Via Rail and CN Rail CEO Ron Lawless to organize the sale of the route, equipment and book of business to the Private Sector. The marketing of the Rocky Mountaineer sale started November 12, 1989. The sale process was run by recently retired CN Executive Charles Armstrong. Submissions of interest demonstrating financial and operational capabilities were required by January 15, 1990. Initially there were 20 interested parties, after phase one of the bidding process, that group was reduced to three parties left to make a financial bid. One bidder was Westours Holland America, subsidiary of Carnival cruise line. The other two were a group of Via Rail Executives and a Western Canadian Entrepreneur. 

After the end of The bidding process, in March 1990, the route's equipment, book of business and branding was sold to Vancouver businessman Peter R.B. Armstrong's Armstrong Hospitality Group Ltd. It ran its first train on May 27, 1990.

Awards
Rocky Mountaineer has been awarded the "World's Leading Travel Experience by Train" at the World Travel Awards seven times for its GoldLeaf service as well as the "World's Leading Luxury Train" award 3 times and was recognized by National Geographic Magazine as one of the "World’s Best Journeys" in 2007. The Society of American Travel Writers, the world's largest organization of professional travel journalists and photographers, rated the Rocky Mountaineer as the world's top train ride in 2009.

Equipment

Rocky Mountaineer operates over 75 railcars in its fleet-

 GP40-2L locomotives, ex-Canadian National Railway
 SD70M locomotives, leased from Union Pacific because the GP40-2L locomotives are non-compliant with positive train control 
 32 "RedLeaf" Canada Car and Foundry single-deck coaches, ex-Canadian National Railway.
 6 "SilverLeaf" single-level dome coaches, rebuilt from RedLeaf coaches.
 16 "GoldLeaf" Colorado Railcar bi-level Ultra Dome coaches, with wrap-over view windows on the top level.
 10 "GoldLeaf" Stadler bi-level glass domed coaches, with restaurant and kitchen in the lower level.

Previous equipment included GE B36-7 locomotives leased from BC Rail.

Routes
Rocky Mountaineer currently operates train journeys on four routes, with three in Canada and one in the United States. Two additional routes (one in Canada and one international) are no longer operated.

 First Passage to the West: This route travels between Vancouver and Banff, with an overnight stop in Kamloops and an intermediate stop in Lake Louise. It operates primarily on Canadian Pacific Railway trackage, although directional running through the Fraser Canyon means that westbound trains use Canadian National Railway tracks in that area.
 Journey Through the Clouds: This route travels between Vancouver and Jasper with an overnight stop in Kamloops. It operates primarily on Canadian National Railway trackage, although directional running through the Fraser Canyon means that eastbound trains use Canadian Pacific Railway tracks in that area.
 Rainforest to Gold Rush: This route travels between North Vancouver and Jasper, with overnight stops in Whistler and Quesnel. It operates on Canadian National Railway trackage, including ex-BC Rail tracks between North Vancouver and Prince George.
Rockies to the Red Rocks: This route travels between Denver and Moab with an overnight stop in Glenwood Springs. It operates on Union Pacific Railroad trackage. Announced in November 2020, this route was initially set to begin service in fall 2021, but this was pushed up, and the first train ran on August 15, 2021.

Former routes 
 Whistler Mountaineer/Whistler Sea to Sky Climb: This route was a day trip operating between North Vancouver and Whistler on Canadian National Railway trackage. It was discontinued after the 2015 season and incorporated into the overlapping Rainforest to Gold Rush route.
 Coastal Passage: This route was a day trip operating between Seattle and Vancouver on BNSF Railway trackage, intended to provide travellers from the United States with easier access to the other Vancouver-based routes. It was discontinued after the 2019 season due to low demand.

Service levels

GoldLeaf
Operating on all routes except the Rockies to the Red Rocks, Rocky Mountaineer's GoldLeaf service is a custom-designed, bi-level, glass-domed coach with full-length windows and reclining seats that can be rotated to accommodate groups of four. Guests are offered hot meals prepared on board the train, served to them in the lower level dining car.

GoldLeaf service is not offered on the Rockies to the Red Rocks route because the coaches exceed the loading gauge; this mainly has to do with the coaches being taller than the Amtrak Superliners and double-stack container trains that frequent the route.

SilverLeaf
Operating on the same routes as GoldLeaf (and being the only service offered on the Rockies of the Red Rocks route), Rocky Mountaineer's SilverLeaf service is a custom-designed, single-level glass domed coach with oversized windows and reclining seats. Guests are offered breakfast and lunch served at their seat.

Trip structure
Rocky Mountaineer trains operate exclusively during the day; no sleeper service is offered. All trips include overnight stops at which passengers disembark and stay in hotels.

As Rocky Mountaineer is primarily a rail-tour service, all journeys are end-to-end. Between their origin and destination, trains only stop for overnight layovers, and no passengers may begin or end their journeys at these stations. The one exception to these provisions is the First Passage to the West route, which has an intermediate stop at Lake Louise station, where westbound passengers may board and eastbound passengers may disembark. No tickets are sold solely for the Banff–Lake Louise portion of the trip.

Trains only operate in the tourist season of April to October.

Connecting services

Rocky Mountaineer train journeys often include bus connections between stations and hotels. Packages may also include bus connections to nearby cities (such as from Banff to Calgary).

While several cities—including Vancouver, Jasper, and Denver—are served by both Rocky Mountaineer and other passenger rail services (such as Via Rail Canada and Amtrak), no single-ticket rail connections are available.

See also
Topdeck
Road Scholar

References

External links

 
 Rocky Mountaineer UK Agent

 
Named passenger trains of Canada
Passenger railways in Alberta
Passenger railways in British Columbia
Railway companies established in 1990
Passenger rail transportation in Colorado
Passenger rail transportation in Utah
Colorado railroads
Utah railroads
Named passenger trains of the United States